Hibbertia saligna is a species of flowering plant in the family Dilleniaceae and is endemic to the east coast of New South Wales. It is an erect or spreading shrub with narrow elliptic to lance-shaped leaves with the narrower end towards the base and relatively large yellow flowers with 20 to 35 stamens arranged around three glabrous carpels.

Description
The upper surface of the leaves is glabrous and the lower softly-hairy. Flowering occurs in spring.

Taxonomy
Hibbertia saligna was first formally described in 1817 by Augustin Pyramus de Candolle in Regni Vegetabilis Systema Naturale from an unpublished description of Robert Brown, from specimens collected by Brown in "mountains near Port Jackson". The specific epithet (saligna) means "resembling a willow".

Distribution and habitat
This hibbertia grows in moist gullies, on creek banks and in sheltered forests in eastern New South Wales, between the Blue Mountains, Glen Davis in the north and Batemans Bay in the south.

References

saligna
Flora of New South Wales
Taxa named by Augustin Pyramus de Candolle
Plants described in 1817